Donatus Buongiorno (born Donato Buongiorno; November 11, 1865 – October 25, 1935) was an Italian-born American painter of the late 19th and early 20th centuries who worked in Naples and New York.

Early life and training
Donatus Buongiorno was born Donato Buongiorno November 11, 1865, in Solofra, Avellino, Italy, to Biagio Buongiorno (1827–after 1898) and Maddalena Solimine (1825–1866). He left Solofra for Naples in the late 1880s to enroll in the Accademia di Belle Arti di Napoli (Academy of Fine Arts of Naples, formerly known as the Royal Academy of Fine Arts of Naples). He graduated in 1886 and later taught there.

Residences and nationality 

He emigrated from Naples to New York City in 1892, and New York remained his base for the next 27 years. He became a naturalized U.S. citizen in 1898. Painting commissions and teaching led him to other American cities including: Boston, Massachusetts; San Francisco, California; Indianapolis, Indiana, Brattleboro, Vermont.

He returned to Italy in 1919 to live full-time, though he continued to travel to the U.S. for work until 1921. Wherever he was based, he always went back to the other country to work for extended periods.

Career 

In New York in the 1890s, he executed privately commissioned portraits and worked as a designer in a wallpaper factory. In the early 1900s, Italian American Catholic churches began commissioning him to paint murals and other church decorations. Those works include: “Apotheosis of the Evangelist,” Church of St. Leonard of the Franciscan Fathers; “St. Charles Borromeo,” Church of Sacred Heart; “The Holy Trinity,” Church of St. Peter; all in Boston, Massachusetts. “Episodes of Christ and St. Charles Borromeo,” Church of St. Lazarus in East Boston, Massachusetts. “Fall of the Angels,” St. Michael’s Catholic Church in Brattleboro, Vermont. “The Apotheosis of St. Clara” (sic), St. Clare’s Church; “Our Lady of Peace,” Church of Our Lady of Peace; “Principal Episodes in the Life of Christ, of St. Francis of Assisi, and of St. Anthony of Padua,” Church of the Most Precious Blood; all in New York.

In Italy, in 1908, he worked on the restoration of La Collegiata di San Michele Arcangelo, an important 17th-century church in his hometown of Solofra, Avellino, where he also had an exhibition of paintings . He attended an international art congress of art educators in Rome in 1911, the same year a painting of his was accepted into the prestigious annual show of the Pennsylvania Academy of the Fine Arts in Philadelphia, Pennsylvania.

In addition to murals and portraits, throughout his life he made easel paintings that he sold out of his studios in New York and Naples. He also served as a dealer for other Italian artists whose works he imported into the U.S. and sold in New York, San Francisco and elsewhere.

Politics and civic life 

Donatus Buongiorno was naturalized as a U.S. citizen in 1898 and was politically active in the United States.

He painted a large portrait of William McKinley which may have been commissioned during McKinley's 1896 presidential campaign, or, after he was assassinated in 1901, for the Pan-American Exposition of 1901 in Buffalo, New York (where President McKinley was shot at the beginning of his second term in office, and where he later succumbed to his wounds.) An inscription on the back of the canvas indicates later ownership by a New York camp of the USWV (United Spanish–American War Veterans) and cites (USN) Flying Squadron #16, possibly that of Rear Admiral W.S. Schley which launched out of New York on its flagship Brooklyn (CA-3) during the Spanish–American War in 1898.

In 1908, Buongiorno joined other artists in signing a petition to the U.S. Congress opposing tariffs on imported artwork.

That same year, Buongiorno sued a famous stage actor, William Faversham, for non-payment of a fee and won. Although the press heavily implied that Buongiorno tried to intimidate the actor into paying a not-quite-confirmed commission,  Buongiorno received a judgment of $29 plus costs two months later.  (Other lawsuits and multiple bankruptcies in later years further revealed the actor’s impecunious history.)

Death 

Buongiorno died on October 25, 1935, in a suburb of Naples, Italy.

Personal life 

Buongiorno was married to Teresina La Gata (b. 1863, Pomigliano D’Arco, Compania, Italy) from 1888 to her death in 1919, and possibly to Jean Skene (1879–?) from 1919 to an unknown date, perhaps his death in 1935.

He had one child, with La Gata, a son, Biagio Buongiorno (1901–1921).

Nick Buongiorno (1908–1985), an American painter, was his nephew.

Notes

References 
 American Publishers’ Association. Men of 1914: An Accurate Biographical Record of Prominent Men in All Walks of Life Who Have Achieved Success in Their Chosen Vocations in the Various Civil, Industrial, and Commercial Lines of Activity, Chicago, 1915.
 Atti del Congresso Artistico Internazionale, Roma Aprile MDCCCXI, Roma, 1911, p. 17.
 Barra, Francesco. Storia illustrata di Avellino e dell’Irpinia, vol. V, Lo Stato unitario, Sellinoi & Barra, Pratola Serra, Avellino, Italia, 1996, p. 207.
 Davenport’s Art Reference & Price Guide 2012 Edition, LTB Gordonsart, Inc., a division of LTB Media, Phoenix, Arizona, 2015, p. 412 [2008].
 Falk, Peter Hastings (Editor). Who Was Who in American Art, 1564-1975, Sound View Press, Madison, Connecticut, 1999, p. 502.
 Falk, Peter Hastings. Annual Exhibition Record of the Pennsylvania Academy of the Fine Arts, 1876–1913, Sound View Press, Madison, Connecticut, 1989, p. 114.
 Garzilli, Francesco. La Collegiata di San Michele Arcangelo in Solofra, memorie e documenti, Napoli, Arte tipografica, 1989.
 Harvard University Department of Economics, ed. “The Brief of the American Free Art League of the Removal of the Duties on Works of Art Submitted to the Ways and Means Committee, Washington, D.C., November 18, 1908,” The Quarterly Journal of Economics, Cambridge, Massachusetts, p. 116.
 Hughes, Edan Milton. Artists in California: 1786-1940, Sacramento, California, Crocker Art Museum, 2002, p. 169.
 Hughes, Edan Milton. Artists in California, 1786-1940, San Francisco, California, Hughes Publishing Company, 1986.
 Levy, Florence N. American Art Annual Vol. VI, New York, MacMillan Co., 1908, p. 324.
 __. American Art Annual Vol. VII, New York, MacMillan Co., 1910, p. 103.
 __. American Art Annual Vol. X, New York, MacMillan Co., 1913, p. 291.
 __. American Art Annual Vol. XII, New York, MacMillan Co., 1915, p. 336.
 __. American Art Annual Vol. XIV, New York, MacMillan Co., 1917, p. 494.
 __. American Art Annual Vol. XVI, New York, MacMillan Co., 1919, p. 324.
 __. American Art Annual Vol. XVIII, New York, MacMillan Co., 1921, p. 343, 494.
 __. American Art Annual Vol. XX, New York, MacMillan Co., 1923, p. 460.
 __. American Art Annual Vol. XXII, New York, MacMillan Co., 1925, p. 428.
 Mallett, Daniel Trowbridge. Mallett’s Index of Artists, New York, R. R. Bowker Co., 1935, reprinted by Peter Smith, 1948, p. 60.
 Murray, Christopher John. Benezit Dictionary of Artists. Gründ, Paris, 2006, vol. 3, p. 19.
 Opitz, Glenn B. Mantle Fielding’s Dictionary of American Painters, Sculptors & Engravers, Poughkeepsie, New York, Apollo Book, 1983, p. 123.
 Soria, Regina. American Artists of Italian Heritage, 1776–1940, Cranbury, New Jersey, Associated University Presses, 1993, p. 44.

1865 births
1925 deaths
19th-century Italian painters
Italian male painters
20th-century Italian painters
19th-century Italian male artists
20th-century Italian male artists